was a Catholic international school, located on the "Bluff" in Naka-ku, Yokohama, Japan. The school started as a division of Gyosei Gakuin in 1888 and was established as an independent school by the Marianists in 1901. St. Joseph closed with the graduating class of June 2000. It served kindergarten, elementary education and secondary education primarily to the expatriate community in Yokohama.

The school was the host to Japan's first Scout troop, established in 1911.

Alumni
 Ureo Egawa (Willy Mueller), class of 1921, actor 
 Charles J. Pedersen, class of 1922, awarded the Nobel Prize in Chemistry in 1987
 Andy Albeck (1921–2010), head of United Artists movie studio
 Isamu Noguchi, class of 1921, Japanese-American artist and landscape architect
 Masumi Okada (Otto Sevaldsen) (1935–2006), class of 1949, actor, singer, stand-up comedian, emcee, and film producer
 Paul Blum, American intelligence officer
 Isaac Shapiro, American lawyer, former president of Japan Society

References

Educational institutions disestablished in 2000
Defunct Catholic schools in Japan
Educational institutions established in 1901
Marianist schools
International schools in Yokohama
1901 establishments in Japan